Konganapuram is a panchayat town in Salem district in the Indian state of Tamil Nadu.

Geography
It has an average elevation of 300 metres (1000 feet).

Demographics
 India census, Konganapuram had a population of 8086. Males constitute 53% of the population and females 47%. Konganapuram has an average literacy rate of 61%, higher than the national average of 59.5%: male literacy is 71%, and female literacy is 49%. In Konganapuram, 10% of the population is under 6 years of age.

Early history
This princely town was ruled by the Cheras, paving the way for the development of the town. The sculptures in Sankari Fort near Konganapuram reveal that this town was under the rule of Tipu Sultan, after which it was conquered by the British. Konganapuram was named after the "konganar sithar".

References

Cities and towns in Salem district